The 1992–93 National Soccer League season, was the 17th season of the National Soccer League in Australia.

Teams

Regular season

League table

Finals series

Individual awards
Player of the Year: Paul Trimboli (South Melbourne)
U-21 Player of the Year: Steve Corica (Marconi Fairfield)
Top Scorer: Francis Awaritefe (South Melbourne) - 19 goals
Coach of the Year: Jim Pyrgolios (South Melbourne)

Notes

References
List of NSL Awards
Australia - List of final tables (RSSSF)
Matrix of 1992/93 NSL season at ozfootball
Scores and match details at ozfootball

National Soccer League (Australia) seasons
1993 in Australian soccer
1992 in Australian soccer
Aus
Aus